("Latin of the stonecutters") or  is an argot employed by stonecutters in Galicia, Spain, particularly in the area of Pontevedra, based on the Galician language. They handed down their knowledge in the art of how to split and cut stone by means of this secret language to the next generation.

Description
The argot contains a number of Basque loanwords.

Sample of text

See also
Barallete
Bron
Cant
Gacería

References 

Cant languages
Occupational cryptolects
Galician language
Cants with Basque influence
Galician culture
Stonemasonry